Bear Island or Isla Teniente González is a rocky island lying  west of Stonington Island in Marguerite Bay, off the coast of Graham Land. Bear Island was presumably known to the British Graham Land Expedition (BGLE) (1934-1937) and the United States Antarctic Service (USAS) Expedition (1939-1941), both based in the Stonington Island area. Bear Island was surveyed in 1947 by the Falkland Islands Dependencies Survey (FIDS), who named it for the USS Bear, flagship of the United States Antarctic Service (USAS) Expedition which visited this area in 1940.

See also 
 Composite Antarctic Gazetteer
 List of Antarctic and subantarctic islands
 SCAR
 Territorial claims in Antarctica

References

External links

Islands of Graham Land
Fallières Coast